Aadhi Pinisetty is an Indian actor who appears in Tamil and Telugu films. He is the recipient of a Nandi Award and a SIIMA Award, in addition to two nominations for Filmfare Awards South.

Born to film director Ravi Raja Pinisetty, he debuted in 2006 with the Telugu film Oka V Chitram. His first prominent role was in the Tamil film Eeram (2009), produced by director S. Shankar.

Early life 
Aadhi Pinisetty was born into a Telugu-speaking family. His father, Ravi Raja Pinisetty has directed over 50 films. He grew up in Chennai and was schooled at Don Bosco.

Career 

Pinisetty made his debut in 2006 with the Teja-directed Oka V Chitram. He later appeared in the Tamil film Mirugam (2007). In 2009, he starred in the supernatural thriller Eeram. In 2010, he had two releases, Ayyanar and Aadu Puli, which were commercial films and were average grossers, building his commercial value well despite the negative reviews. His next films were Aravaan (2012), Gundello Godari (2013), Vallinam (2014) and Kochadaiyaan (2014) Yagavarayinum Naa Kaakka (2015). He has been the successful film, Sarrainodu (2016), for which he got critical acclaim, with one reviewer commenting that Aadhi's screen presence elevates the film. In 2017, he starred in the thriller Maragadha Naanayam, which turned out to be a surprise box office success. The same year he starred in the Telugu romantic-drama film Ninnu Kori, alongside Nani. His portrayal as Arun in the latter was well reviewed by one reviewer. In 2018, he appeared in Telugu films with Agnyaathavaasi, Rangasthalam, Neevevaro and the Bilingual U Turn.

Personal life 
In March 2022, Pinisetty got engaged to his long-time girlfriend and actress Nikki Galrani. They married on 18 May 2022 in a private function attended by close family and friends.

Filmography

Television

Discography

Awards and nominations

References

External links
 

Indian male film actors
Male actors in Tamil cinema
Living people
21st-century Indian male actors
Telugu male actors
Male actors in Telugu cinema
Male actors from Chennai
South Indian International Movie Awards winners
Santosham Film Awards winners
Indian male actors
1982 births